The list of ship launches in 1747 includes a chronological list of some ships launched in 1747.


References

1747
Ship launches